The 2021 Uzbekistan Super League (known as the Coca-Cola Uzbekistan Super League for sponsorship reasons) is the 30th season of top-level football in Uzbekistan since its establishment on 1992. Pakhtakor Tashkent were the defending champions from the 2020 campaign.

Season events

Teams

Managerial changes

Foreign players

The number of foreign players is restricted to five per USL team. A team can use only five foreign players on the field in each game.

In bold: Players that have been capped for their national team.

League table

Positions by round

Results

Results by match played

Relegation play-off

|}

Season Statistics
 First goal of the season: Alvin Fortes for AGMK against Lokomotiv Tashkent

.

Goalscorers

Attendances

By round

By team

Awards

Monthly awards

See also
2021 Uzbekistan Pro League 
2021 Uzbekistan Pro-B League 
2021 Uzbekistan Second League
2021 Uzbekistan Cup 
2021 Uzbekistan League Cup

References

Uzbekistan
Uzbekistan Super League seasons
2021 in Uzbekistani football